Abbas El-Zein (Arabic: ﻋﺒﺎﺲ اﻟﺰﻳﻦ ; born 1963) is an Australian writer and academic. He is the author of two acclaimed works of fiction – a novel, Tell the Running Water and a collection of short stories, The Secret Maker of the World – as well as an award-winning memoir, Leave to Remain, about growing up in civil-war Lebanon and migrating to Europe and Australia. He has published essays and articles on war, displacement and environmental decline. His work has appeared in the New York Times the Guardian the Age, the Sydney Morning Herald, as well as literary magazines Meanjin, Heat and Overland. His work is a manifestation of a growing number of Anglo-Arab and Franco-Arab writers, emerging in the 2000s, especially authors from a Lebanese background writing in English or French, post Lebanese civil war, such as Rabih Alameddine, Nada Awar Jarrar, Wajdi Mouawad and Rawi Hage, in whose work themes of violence, loss, memory and identity are prominent. He has made numerous media appearances. As a scholar, he has authored and co-authored a large number of scientific papers on environmental sustainability, tackling issues in hydrology, sea level rise and development. He has lectured at the American University of Beirut and the University of New South Wales. He is professor of environmental engineering at the University of Sydney.

Background
Abbas El-Zein was born and grew up in Beirut. He was twelve years of age when the Lebanese civil war broke out in 1975. He was educated at the bilingual French-Arabic school, Mission Laique Francaise. After graduating with a degree in civil engineering from the American University of Beirut in 1986, he left for the UK where he acquired Master's and PhD degrees in computational mechanics and mathematical modelling from the University of Southampton, and later, a Master's by research degree in environmental science from the Ecole Nationale des Ponts et Chaussées in Paris. He lived and worked in the UK and France for a number of years before moving to Australia in 1995. He started writing his first novel while living in the UK. In 1993, he participated in a writing workshop/retreat run by Beryl Bainbridge and Bernice Rubens at the Tŷ Newydd Writing Centre, Wales. Later, he published a number of essays in Meanjin and Heat and completed his first novel in 1998. In 2005, he won an Australia Council for the Arts grant for new work, which led to the writing of his memoir Leave to Remain in 2009.

Awards and honours
 Australia Council for the Arts Grant – New Literary Work (2005)
 New South Wales Premier Literary Award – Community Relations Commission Award (2010)

Books
 Tell the Running Water, Spectre, Hodder Headline, 2001, 248 pages, 
 Leave to Remain, A Memoir, University of Queensland Press, 2009, 304 pages 
 The Secret Maker of the World, University of Queensland Press, 2014, 192 pages,

References

External links
 Official Website
 University of Sydney Page

Australian writers
Lebanese academics
Living people
1963 births
Academic staff of the University of Sydney